Government Secretariat may refer to:

Organisations
 Government Secretariat (Hong Kong)

Buildings
 Kerala Government Secretariat
 Ministers' Building, Burma, previously known as the Government Secretariat

See also
 Secretariat (disambiguation)